Lawrence Hyde (1593–1643) was an English lawyer and politician who sat in the House of Commons in two parliaments between 1624 and 1629. 

Hyde was the son of Sir Lawrence Hyde, of Heale, Woodford, near Salisbury, Wiltshire. He was the brother of Robert Hyde and Alexander Hyde, and cousin of Edward Hyde, 1st Earl of Clarendon. He was a student of Middle Temple in 1608 and matriculated at Magdalen Hall, Oxford on 9 March 1610, aged 16, then was awarded BA on 19 July 1612.

In 1624, Hyde was elected Member of Parliament for Hindon. He was re-elected for Hindon in 1628 and sat until 1629 when King Charles decided to rule without parliament for eleven years. 

Hyde died in 1643 and was buried on 3 December 1643. He was married in 1619 to Amphillis, daughter of Sir Richard Tichborne of Winchester; she died in 1632. Secondly to Katherine, who outlived him. In October 1651 she gave shelter to the future Charles II at Heale House during his flight after the Battle of Worcester.

References

 

1593 births
1643 deaths
Members of the Middle Temple
Alumni of Magdalen Hall, Oxford
People from Wiltshire
English MPs 1624–1625
English MPs 1628–1629